, located in Hachinohe, Aomori, is a Shinto shrine in Japan. It was first built in 1269 on top of the Kabushima island by fishermen to pray for safety and good harvest at sea.  The shrine has been rebuilt several times throughout its history. It was burnt down in November 2015 and rebuilt in 2020.

The shrine is linked with the black-tailed gull (海猫, umineko, "sea cat" in Japanese) found in great numbers on the island between March and August as the island is their nesting ground. The gulls are associated with the Buddhist goddess Benzaiten, whose image is found within the shrine. The droppings of the gulls falling on people is considered good luck and people may go to the shrine to receive a commemorative tablet should it happen, although umbrellas are provided at the location for visitors who need them for shelter.

See also
 List of Shinto shrines

References

External links
  Official website 

Shinto shrines in Aomori Prefecture
1260s establishments in Japan
1269 establishments in Asia